Seven ships of the Royal Navy have borne the name HMS Favourite, or HMS Favorite:

 may have been a 14-gun sloop launched in 1740.
 was a 14-gun sloop launched in 1757 and sold in 1784.
 was a 16-gun sloop launched in 1794. The French captured her in 1806 and renamed her Favorite, but the British recaptured her in 1807 and renamed her HMS Goree. She became a prison ship in 1814 and was broken up in 1817.
 was a survey cutter purchased in 1805 and sold c. 1813.
 was an 18-gun  broken up in 1821.
 was an 18-gun sloop launched in 1829. She became a coal hulk in 1859 and was sold in 1905. She bore the name Favorite between 1836 and 1856, and was designated C3 and later C77 while in use as a coal hulk.
 was an ironclad screw corvette launched in 1864 and sold in 1886.

Other
On 10 March 1806 the Principal Officers and Commissioners of His Majesty's Navy offered "His Majesty's Schooner Favorite", "lying at Portsmouth", for sale. It is not clear what vessel this was.

Citations

Royal Navy ship names